A Small Domain is a 1996 short film written and directed by Britta Sjogren. It premiered at the 1996 Sundance Film Festival, where it won the Grand Jury Prize for Best Short Film, and subsequently won several festival awards during 1996 and 1997. Sjogren was inspired by her friendship with actress Beatrice Hayes and Haye's relationship with her late husband. Hays took the role of the character based on her.

Plot
An elderly woman prepares to celebrate the anniversary of her marriage to her late husband. She steals what she needs and ends up taking home a baby that she finds at a bus stop.

Cast
Ana Gasteyer as Mother
Beatrice Hayes as Woman
Rebecca Guadalupe Kuntz as Baby
Lance Sjogren as Clerk
Emily Sperling as Little Girl

Awards
In 1996, A Small Domain won the Short Filmmaking Award at the Sundance Film Festival, the Special Jury Award at the USA Film Festival and Special Recognition at Aspen Shortsfest. In 1997 it won the SXSW Competition Award at the SXSW Film Festival, the Special Jury Artistic Merit Award at the Cinequest San Jose Film Festival and the North Carolina Filmmaker Award at the Charlotte Film & Video Festival.

References

External links

1996 films
1996 short films
American short films
Films produced by Andrea Sperling
1990s English-language films